Commodore User, known to the readers as the abbreviated CU, was one of the oldest British Commodore magazines. With a publishing history spanning over 15 years, it mixed content with technical and video game features. Incorporating Vic Computing in 1983 by publishers EMAP, the magazine's focus moved to the emerging Commodore 64 before introducing Amiga coverage in 1986, paving the way for Amiga's dominance and a title change to CU Amiga in 1990. Covering the 16-bit computer, the magazine continued for another eight years until the last issue was published in October 1998, when EMAP opted to close the magazine due to falling sales and a change in focus for EMAP. The magazine also reviewed arcade games.

Timeline
Carrying on from where Vic Computing left, Commodore User was launched in October 1983 with an initial preview issue in June. Initially, the magazine contained what was referred to as the serious side of computing, with programming tutorials, machine code features, and business software reviews. The first issues were produced and written by a small team, which consisted of editor Dennis Jarrett, a writer (future editor Bohdan Buciak) and editorial assistant Nicky Chapman. The features were written by a range of contributors, and the issue sizes grew rapidly from 64 to 96 pages.

The first 12 issues were published by Paradox Group and then from October 1984 by Emap for the rest of magazine's lifetime.

Games coverage began to appear from the second issue. This consisted of a small section called Screen Scene from issue three. This became a permanent fixture throughout the magazine's life.

By 1985 the Commodore 64 became more popular, and the magazine began to cover the newer machine more and more, leaving the Vic-20 in the dark. The amount of technical coverage also decreased as the games market took over. Gradually the circulation began to rise, and CU produced more colour through the magazine. At the height of the C64's success, CU had a page count of 116.

In 1986 CU began to cover the new 16-bit computer: the Amiga. The magazine was at an all-time high, covering all the Commodore platforms, from the C16 to the Amiga. Circulation figures also showed an all-time high of over 70,000 for the 1988 period.

To establish that the magazine content was changing to cover the emerging Amiga, the magazine changed its title CU Commodore User Amiga-64 with emphasis on the CU part in the February 1989 issue. The Commodore User part was dropped quickly, and the name became CU Amiga-64. This period of the magazine was a transitional time between transferring coverage from C64 to the Amiga.

Realizing that the C64 market was in an undeniable decline in 1990, CU decided to concentrate fully on the Amiga, dropping C64 coverage and relaunching their redesigned magazine as CU Amiga.

CU Amiga

History
A new decade had arrived with a successor of the C64, the Amiga 500 (A500). The A500 was seen as the "little brother" of an equally successful A2000 (aimed at businesses) and had successfully penetrated the home computer market. In 1990 CU Amiga-64 dropped the "64" from its name and relaunched it as CU Amiga with the March 1990 issue. CU Amiga dropped all coverage of the C64 and concentrated on the new popular Amiga platform, which expanded to include: A3000, A500+, A600, and A1200. A4000 and CD32. The magazine eventually gained increased circulation as a result of the changes.

By late 1994, the Amiga's popularity was in decline. CU Amiga had a final name change to help distinguish itself from other competing magazines in an increasingly small market. It became CU Amiga Magazine. In its remaining years under the control of editor Tony Horgan, the magazine became highly technical but also gained a professional edge.  Some staff from sister magazine The One were moved to CU when the former closed in July 1995 and provided games coverage for CU readers.

The final issue featured a memorable upside-down cover with a foot imprinting on the logo, intended to be reminiscent of the imagery used by Monty Python. The magazine came to an end without the preceding page, staff or quality cuts that had afflicted some other Amiga magazines. CU Amiga Magazines closure meant that the only remaining monthly Amiga newsstand magazine was its closest rival, Amiga Format.

A year after CUs closure, in October 1999, the magazine Amiga Active was launched. It had several of the same staff and was competition for Amiga Format, which it ultimately outlived by being published until November 2001.

References

External links 

CU Amiga Magazine Online
Amiga History: CU Amiga
Short History and full scans of the magazine
Home page of EMAP
Computer magazine history including CU
Archived Commodore User Magazines at Internet Archive

Commodore 8-bit computer magazines
Home computer magazines
Defunct computer magazines published in the United Kingdom
Magazines established in 1983
Magazines disestablished in 1990
Amiga magazines
Video game magazines published in the United Kingdom